The Swift Creek Mill is a historic grist mill at 17401 Jefferson Davis Hwy in South Chesterfield, Virginia, just across Swift Creek from the city of Colonial Heights.  Built about 1850, the present brick mill structure is one of a long line of mills that have occupied this site since the mid-17th century.  The mill was adapted for use as the Swift Creek Mill Theater in the 1960s.  It was listed on the National Register of Historic Places in 1974.

See also
National Register of Historic Places listings in Chesterfield County, Virginia

References

National Register of Historic Places in Chesterfield County, Virginia
Buildings and structures completed in 1850
Buildings and structures in Chesterfield County, Virginia
Grinding mills in Virginia